Absolutely Fabulous is a 2001 French comedy film co-written and directed by Gabriel Aghion. It is an adaptation of the British television sitcom Absolutely Fabulous, created by Jennifer Saunders and Dawn French.

The film stars Josiane Balasko, Nathalie Baye, Marie Gillain and Claude Gensac. To parallel the role of Lulu in the original series, French singer Chantal Goya appeared as herself. Saunders makes a cameo appearance as a spectator sitting next to Catherine Deneuve at a fashion show.

Cast
 Josiane Balasko as Edith "Eddie" Mousson
 Nathalie Baye as Patricia "Patsy" Laroche
 Marie Gillain as Safrane Vaudoye
 Vincent Elbaz as Jonathan
 Claude Gensac as Mamie Mousson
 Yves Rénier as Alain Vaudoye
 Saïd Taghmaoui as Manu
 Armelle as Cerise
 Tomer Sisley as Kevin

Cameo appearances
 Chantal Goya as herself
 Stéphane Bern as himself
 Christophe Robin as himself
 Jean-Paul Gaultier as himself
 Catherine Deneuve as herself
 Jennifer Saunders as herself
 Brigitte Fontaine as herself
 Estelle Lefébure as herself
 Claire Chazal as herself

Production
Aghion's stated reason for making the film was to increase awareness of the series in France, where it was not widely known. For the screenplay, Aghion translated scenes from the original series, and tied them together into a coherent screenplay.

The role of Patsy was originally offered to Amanda Lear, who declined by saying that she had "already lived it".

Reception
The film performed poorly at the French box office and was panned by most French critics, who argued that it failed to translate the typically British humour of the original television series.

References

External links
 
 

2001 comedy films
2001 films
Absolutely Fabulous
Films based on television series
Films directed by Gabriel Aghion
French comedy films
2000s French-language films
StudioCanal films
2000s French films